The Misuse of Drugs Act 1971 is an Act of the Parliament of the United Kingdom. It represents action in line with treaty commitments under the Single Convention on Narcotic Drugs, the Convention on Psychotropic Substances, and the United Nations Convention Against Illicit Traffic in Narcotic Drugs and Psychotropic Substances.

Offences under the Act include:
 Possession of a controlled drug unlawfully
 Possession of a controlled drug with intent to supply it
 Supplying or offering to supply a controlled drug (even where no charge is made for the drug)
 Allowing premises you occupy or manage to be used unlawfully for the purpose of producing or supplying controlled drugs

It is often presented as little more than a list of prohibited drugs and of penalties linked to their possession and supply. In practice, however, the act establishes the Home Secretary as a key player in a drug licensing system. Therefore, for example, various opiates are available legally as prescription-only medicines, and cannabis (hemp) may be grown under licence for 'industrial purposes'. The Misuse of Drugs Regulations 2001, created under the 1971 Act, are about licensing of production, possession and supply of substances classified under the act.

The act creates three classes of controlled substances, A, B, and C, and ranges of penalties for illegal or unlicensed possession and possession with intent to supply are graded differently within each class. The lists of substances within each class can be amended by order, so the Home Secretary can list new drugs and upgrade, downgrade or delist previously controlled drugs with less of the bureaucracy and delay associated with passing an act through both Houses of Parliament.

Critics of the Act such as David Nutt say that its classification is not based on how harmful or addictive the substances are, and that it is unscientific to omit substances like tobacco and alcohol.

Provisions

Section 37 – Interpretation
Section 37(5) became spent on the repeal of sections 8 to 10 of the Pharmacy and Poisons Act 1933. It was repealed by Group 7 of Part 17 of Schedule 1 to the Statute Law (Repeals) Act 2004.

List of controlled drugs 

The Act sets out four separate categories: Class A, Class B, Class C and temporary class drugs. Substances may be removed and added to different parts of the schedule by statutory instrument, provided a report of the Advisory Council on the Misuse of Drugs has been commissioned and has reached a conclusion, although the Secretary of State is not bound by the council's findings.

Class A includes cocaine, heroin, morphine, oxycodone, fentanyl, MDMA ("ecstasy"), methamphetamine, LSD, DMT, mescaline extract, and psilocybin (magic mushrooms).

Class B includes cannabis, ketamine, amphetamine, codeine, methcathinone, barbiturates, mephedrone, methaqualone and methylphenidate. Any class B drug that is prepared for injections becomes a class A substance.

Class C includes benzodiazepines, pregabalin, and most other non-barbiturate tranquillisers; GHB; tramadol; cathinone; and anabolic steroids.

All other psychoactive drugs except alcohol, caffeine, and tobacco (or other nicotine preparations) are controlled under the Psychoactive Substances Act 2016 and Medicines Act 1968.

Penalties 
The penalties for drug offences depend on the class of drug involved. These penalties are enforced against those who do not have a valid prescription or licence to possess the drug in question. Thus, it is not illegal for someone to possess heroin, a Class A drug, so long as it was administered to them legally (by prescription).

Class A drugs attract the highest penalty, and imprisonment is both "proper and expedient". The maximum penalties possible are as follows:

International cooperation 

The act makes it a crime to assist in, incite, or induce, the commission of an offence, outside the UK, against another nation's corresponding law on drugs. A corresponding law is defined as another country's law "providing for the control and regulation in that country of the production, supply, use, export and import of drugs and other substances in accordance with the provisions of the Single Convention on Narcotic Drugs" or another drug control treaty to which the UK and the other country are parties. An example might be lending money to a United States drug dealer for the purpose of violating that country's Controlled Substances Act.

History 
The Drugs (Prevention of Misuse) Act 1964 controlled amphetamines in the United Kingdom in advance of international agreements and was later used to control LSD.

Before 1971, the UK had a relatively liberal drugs policy and it was not until United Nations influence had been brought to bear that controlling incidental drug activities was employed to effectively criminalise drugs use. It is noted that bar the smoking of opium and cannabis; Section 8, part d, under the 1971 Act was not an offence (relating to the prosecution of the owner of a premises/building inside of which controlled drugs were being used). Section 8 of the Misuse of Drugs Act 1971 was amended by Regulation 13 of Misuse of Drugs Regulations 1985 and Section 38 of the Criminal Justice and Police Act 2001. 
These amendments were however repealed in 2005 by Schedule 1 (part 6) of the Drugs Act 2005,.

The Current Section 8 covers:
people knowingly allowing premises they own, manage, or have responsibility for, to be used by any other person for:

 administration or use of any controlled drug
 supply of any controlled drug
 the production or cultivation of controlled drugs, (such as growing cannabis, making Crystal meth, preparing Magic mushrooms).

Criticism and controversy 
Notable criticism of the act includes:
 Drug classification: making a hash of it?, Fifth Report of Session 2005–06, House of Commons Science and Technology Committee, which said that the present system of drug classification is based on historical assumptions, not scientific assessment.
  Development of a rational scale to assess the harm of drugs of potential misuse, David Nutt, Leslie A. King, William Saulsbury, Colin Blakemore, The Lancet, 24 March 2007, said the act is "not fit for purpose" and "the exclusion of alcohol and tobacco from the Misuse of Drugs Act is, from a scientific perspective, arbitrary."

The Transform Drug Policy Foundation offers rational criticism of the harms caused by the Government's  current prohibitionist drug policy. The Drug Equality Alliance (DEA) has launched legal actions against the UK Government's partial and unequal administration of the Act's discretionary powers, making particular reference to the arbitrary exclusion of alcohol and tobacco on the subjective  grounds of historical and cultural precedents contrary to the Act's policy and objects.

Classification of cannabis has become especially controversial. In 2004, cannabis was reclassified from class B to class C, in accordance with advice from the Advisory Council on the Misuse of Drugs (ACMD). In 2009, it was returned to class B, against ACMD advice.

In February 2009 the UK government was accused by its most senior expert drugs adviser Professor David Nutt of making a political decisions with regard to drug classification in rejecting the scientific advice to downgrade ecstasy from a class A drug. The Advisory Council on the Misuse of Drugs (ACMD) report on ecstasy, based on a 12-month study of 4,000 academic papers, concluded that it is nowhere near as dangerous as other class A drugs such as heroin and crack cocaine, and should be downgraded to class B. The advice was not followed. Jacqui Smith, then Home Secretary, was also widely criticised by the scientific community for bullying Professor David Nutt into apologising for his comments that, in the course of a normal year, more people died from falling off horses than died from taking ecstasy. Professor Nutt was later sacked by Alan Johnson (Jacqui Smith's successor as Home Secretary); Johnson saying "It is important that the government's messages on drugs are clear and as an advisor you do nothing to undermine public understanding of them. I cannot have public confusion between scientific advice and policy and have therefore lost confidence in your ability to advise me as Chair of the ACMD."

In May 2011, a report named Taking Drugs Seriously was released by Demos. It discusses several issues with the current system, since its enactment in 1971. It states that the constant presence of new drugs will make it difficult for the government to keep up with the latest situation - over 600 drugs are now classified under the act. Comparison levels of harm previously demonstrated by David Nutt show that alcohol and tobacco were among the most lethal, while some class A drugs, such as MDMA, LSD, and magic mushrooms, were among the least harmful.

Use of controlled substances for research 
A common misunderstanding amongst researchers is that most national laws (including the Misuse for Drugs Act) allows the use of small amounts of a controlled substance for non-clinical / non-in vivo research without licences. A typical use case might be having a few milligrams or microlitres of a controlled substance within larger chemical collections (often 10K’s of chemicals) for in vitro screening. Researchers often believe that there is some form of "research exemption" for such small amounts. This incorrect view may be further re-enforced by R&D chemical suppliers often stating and asking scientists to confirm that anything bought is for research use only.

A further misconception is that the Misuse of Drugs Act simply lists a few hundred substances (e.g. MDMA, Fentanyl, Amphetamine, etc.) and compliance can be achieved via checking a CAS number, chemical name or similar identifier. However, the reality is that in most cases all ethers, esters, salts and stereo isomers are also controlled and it is impossible to simply list all of these. The act contains several "generic statements" or "chemical space" laws, which aim to control all chemicals similar to the "named" substance, these provide detailed descriptions similar to Markushes, a good example of a few of these are found in the Misuse of Drugs Act 1971 (amendment) order 2013.

Due to this complexity in legislation the identification of controlled chemicals in research is often carried out computationally, either by in house systems maintained a company’s sample logistics department or by the use commercial software solutions. Automated systems are often required as many research operations can often have chemical collections running into 10Ks of molecules at the 1–5 mg scale, which are likely to include controlled substances, especially within medicinal chemistry research, even if the core research of the company is not narcotic or psychotropic drugs. These may not have been controlled when created, but they have subsequently been declared controlled, or fall within chemical space close to known controlled substances.

There are no specific research exemptions in the Misuse of Drugs Act. However, the associated Misuse of Drug Regulations 2001 does exempt products containing less than 1 mg of a controlled substance (1 ug for lysergide and derivatives) so long as a number of requirements are met, including that it cannot be recovered by readily applicable means, does not pose a risk to human health and is not meant for administration to a human or animal.

Although this does at first seem to allow research use, in most circumstances the sample, by definition, is “recoverable” - in order to prepare it for use the sample is ‘recovered’ into an assay buffer or solvent such as DMSO or water. In 2017 the Home Office also confirmed that the 1 mg limit applies to the total of all preparations across the entire container in the case of sample microtitre plates.  Given this, most companies and researchers choose not to rely on this exemption.

However according to Home Office licensing, "University research departments generally do not require licences to possess and supply drugs in schedules 2, 3, 4 part I, 4 part II and schedule 5, but they do require licences to produce any of those drugs and to produce, possess and/or supply drugs in schedule 1".

See also 
Dangerous Drugs (Supply to Addicts) Regulations 1968

Notes

References

External links 

 The Misuse of Drugs Act 1971, as originally enacted, from Legislation.gov.uk
 UK Misuse of Drugs Act, Steve Chapman website, access 28 January 2009
 Controlled Drugs, Patient UK website, accessed 30 January 2009

 
United Kingdom Acts of Parliament 1971
English criminal law
1971 in cannabis